Ausaf Sayeed (born 18 September, 1963) is an Indian diplomat, belonging to Indian Foreign Service of 1989 batch. He is currently serving as the Secretary (Consular, Passport, Visa & Overseas Indian Affairs) since March 2022.

Career
Sayeed is a career diplomat in the Indian Foreign Service (IFS), 1989 Batch.  He has been appointed as Secretary (CPV & OIA) in the Ministry of External Affairs since March 2022. He previously served as the Ambassador of India to Saudi Arabia from April 2019 to March 2022. Before this assignment he served as High Commissioner of India to Seychelles from February 17, 2017 till April 2019.  Earlier in August 2013 he became the first Muslim and first Hyderabadi to be appointed as the Consul General of India in Chicago . Earlier he served as Ambassador of India to Yemen from September 2010 to July 2013, being the first person of Hadhrami origin to be appointed as India's Ambassador to Yemen.

Sayeed has worked on political, economic, consular and cultural issues, besides Hajj management.

He launched several business groupings during his assignment in the Persian Gulf countries to promote trade and economic relations between India and Arab states of the Persian Gulf.

Sayeed has contributed in promoting India’s cultural heritage abroad. He was associated with the inauguration of the Maulana Azad Cultural Center in Cairo (1992).  In 1997, he organized the "Satyajit Ray: in retrospect", a one-week film festival of Satyajit Ray’s films in Riyadh, Saudi Arabia.  As Coordinator of the Indian Cultural Center in Qatar, he was instrumental in organizing several cultural and literary events. In 1999, he organized a 9-day festival India Week in Qatar in association with the National Council of Culture, Art and Heritage in Qatar in which several artists from India participated. During his tenure in Copenhagen, Denmark from 2000-2004, he extended support to a project called `Crosscurrents: The Indo-Danish Painters' meet in which joint painting exhibitions and workshops by Indian and Danish painters were organized in various cities in India and Denmark.

During his tenure as the Consul General of India in Jeddah, he organized the first-ever India Festival in Jeddah (September 2005), followed by the First Asian Festival in Jeddah (October 2006) and the First Asian Film Festival in Saudi Arabia (February 2008). He was closely involved with the formation of the Saudi-India Friendship Society  in 2006 under the patronage of the Saudi Ministry of Information and Culture. He was also associated with the Saudi-India Civil Society Dialogue. He was instrumental in organizing the visit of First All Women Saudi Student Delegation (from Dar-Al Hekma College ) to India in 2007.

He formed the Asian Consuls General Club (ACGC) in Jeddah in 2005, which was composed of Consuls General of thirteen Asian countries. He was instrumental in the publication of the book Historic Indo-Arab Ties (September 2005) by the Indian Consulate. He was the main architect behind the introduction of external Urdu examinations of MANUU in the Kingdom of Saudi Arabia for the benefit of Non-resident Indians (NRIs). He has advocated extensive use of digital technology to learn, spread the Urdu language, especially among the youth and children.

Dr. Ausaf Sayeed launched a revamped Saudi–India Business Network (SIBN)  in Saudi Arabia in September 2020, initially with chapters in the cities of Jeddah and Riyadh. Later a chapter was launched in Dammam.  He also re-launched the Indo-Saudi Medical Forum (ISMF)  with chapters in Jeddah and Riyadh to boost cooperation in the healthcare sector between India and Saudi Arabia. Originally, the ISMF was launched in the year 2008 during his tenure in Jeddah as the Consul General of India.

He was instrumental in the signing of a memorandum of understanding (MoU) on Yoga  between India and Saudi Arabia, the first such agreement signed by any Islamic nation with India. The prestigious Yoga Mithra Award  was presented to Dr. Ausaf Sayeed by the S-Vyasa University for his efforts to promote Yoga  in Saudi Arabia.

Publications
Dr. Ausaf Sayeed has published three books: 
 Indian Art & Culture, 
 Trends In Indian Culture And Heritage: For Civil Services (Prelims and Mains) and other Competitive Examinations and 
 Trends in Objective Geology For Civil Services & Other Competitive Examinations. 

He has also compiled and edited the Urdu book Kulliyat-e-Awaz Sayeed, which consists of the entire Urdu literary works of his father late Awaz Sayeed. The book Kulliyat-e-Awaz Sayeed  was released by Vice President of India Mohammad Hamid Ansari on August 13, 2009. 

He is also working on two other books, Haj: an Indian Experience through the Ages and Indian Rubats, Madarsas and Wakfs in the Holy Cities of Makkah and Madinah. 

He also has to his credit a research paper on Petrology and Petrogenesis of Syenites from the Cuddapah Basin, Andhra Pradesh, Journal, Geological Society of India, Volume 43, March 1994, pp 225–237.

References

Indian Muslims
Living people
Indian diplomats
Hadhrami people
1963 births
People from Hyderabad, India